Kev Hopper (born 1961) is an English bass guitarist.

Life and career
Hopper is probably best known as the bass guitarist with Stump, an Anglo/Irish indie/experimental/rock group formed in London in 1983. Stump released two albums, the self released mini album Quirk Out in 1986 and their only full-length release A Fierce Pancake in 1988. Since the late 1980s, his mainly instrumental output has been diverse and best described as a hybrid style of experimental and melodic pop with his distinctive bass playing often to the fore. He has also created electronica with the group Ticklish and minimal pulse music in a Rock band format with Prescott (formed in 2012) featuring Scritti Politti keyboardist Rhodri Marsden, drummer Frank Byng, adding Pere Ubu guitarist, Keith Moliné in 2016.

Hopper is also a visual artist (painter).

Discography

Solo albums
 Stolen Jewels (1990), Ghetto Records
 The Stinking Rose  (1993), retrospective Bandcamp digital release
 Spoombung (1998), Thoofa 
 Whispering Foils (2000) Drag City/Duophonic
 Saurus (2002), Drag City/ Afterhours [Japan]
 I Saw Spoombung's Daughter Consumed by Kirby Dots (2005), Afterhours (Japan)
 The Germjoin (2012), Afterhours (Japan)
 Tonka Beano (2013), Linear Obsessional Records
 Kevlington (2015), Bandcamp digital release
 Corbyn Sceptic Club (2018), Linear Obsessional Records
 Moving and Handling (2020), Bandcamp digital release
 Peppa Vesticle (2021), Bandcamp digital release
 Sans Noodles (2022), Dimple Discs

with Stump
 Mud on a Colon EP (1986), Ron Johnson (UK Indie #39)
 Quirk Out (1986), Stuff (UK Indie #2)
 The Peel Sessions EP (1987), Strange Fruit (UK Indie #13)
 A Fierce Pancake (1988), Ensign
 Chaos (1988), Ensign
Charlton Heston, (1988) Ensign (UK #72)
 Buffalo (1988), Ensign
 The Complete Anthology box set (2008), Sanctuary
 Does the Fish Have Chips? (2014) Cherry Red Records

with Ticklish
 Ticklish (2000), GROB
 Rubato (joint E.P. with Fizzarum, 2005) Textile Records
 Here Are Your New Instructions (2005) Textile Records

with Prescott
 One Did (2014) Slowfoot Records
 Thing or Two (2017) Bandcamp digital release. Thoofa Records

References

External links
 https://www.discogs.com/artist/99763-Kev-Hopper

1961 births
Living people
English rock bass guitarists
English male guitarists
Male bass guitarists
Stump (band) members